Modus vivendi is a Latin phrase meaning "way of life".

Modus Vivendi may refer to:

Modus Vivendi (070 Shake album), 2020
Modus Vivendi (Tad Morose album), 2003